The 1875 Victorian football season was an Australian rules football competition played during the winter of 1875. The season consisted of matches between metropolitan and provincial football clubs in the colony of Victoria.

1875 premiership 
Seven metropolitan clubs participated in senior football during the 1875 season: Albert-park, Carlton Imperial, East Melbourne,  and St Kilda cum University, a combined team from St Kilda and Melbourne University.

As had been the case for several years, Carlton and Melbourne were considered the dominant clubs in the city, so the premier club was decided based entirely on the head-to-head record between the clubs; in their four meetings, Carlton won three and Melbourne won one, so Carlton was recognised as the premier club for the season.

Club senior records 
The below table shows the results for senior clubs during the 1875 season. The list shows the club records across all matches, including senior, junior and odds matches.

The clubs are listed here in the order in which they were ranked in the Australasian newspaper: other than announcing the top three place-getters, there was no formal process by which the clubs were ranked, so the below order should be considered indicative only, particularly since the fixturing of matches was not standardised.

Notable events 
 In the provincial competition,  were premiers. Additionally, it became the permanent owners of the Western District Challenge Cup, which it had held since the start of 1874. Geelong won the cup after its controversial win against Ballarat on 25 September at the Argyle Ground, Geelong. In the match, Austin of Geelong, while in possession of the ball, weaved through several spectators who were encroaching on the playing field, before passing to Fairbain who kicked a goal. Ballarat protested against the goal on the basis of interference; when the goal was upheld, Ballarat walked off the ground and forfeited the match.
 A Challenge Cup played as a double round-robin amongst the second twenties of the senior clubs was staged during the season, and was won by the Carlton Imperial seconds after it defeated Albert-park 1–0 in the final on 9 October.

External links 
 History of Australian rules football in Victoria (1853-1900)

References 

Australian rules football competition seasons
1875 in sports
1875 in Australian sport
Victorian football season